"Leave Me Alone (I'm Lonely)" is a song by Pink, and was the sixth single from her fourth album, I'm Not Dead (2006).  It was released in 2007 as a physical CD single in Australia, and as a download-only EP in the UK with "Dear Mr. President". The EP features live versions of both songs. Certain European countries received a physical CD release of the single.

In the beginning of February 2007, before its official release as a single, the song was put on the B-list of BBC Radio 1. It debuted on the UK Singles Chart at number 60, and it rose to number 34, her lowest-peaking UK single at that time. In Australia the single debuted at number 11 and peaked at number five, becoming Pink's fourth top five hit from the album I'm Not Dead; the single also reached the top five in New Zealand and was certified Gold on October 5, 2008, selling over 7,500 copies.

Composition 
"Leave Me Alone (I'm Lonely)" was written by Pink and co-written and produced by Butch Walker. It is a power pop song in which she demands some time away from a clinging lover.

Critical reception 
The song received mixed to positive reviews from critics. IGN's wrote a mixed to favorable review for the song, stating that "The title should say it all and reveal the ball of confusion that Pink really is. It's one of the most rockin' tunes on the whole album, but it's over-the-top arena pop rock, not ball crunching, barroom rawk." Quentin Huff from PopMatters thought that "Pink summons the spirits of the Go-Gos and Tiffany (“I Think We're Alone Now”)" on the track. Todd Murphs from Stylus Magazine wrote a mixed review, saying that "the ode to schizophrenia, “Leave Me Alone (I’m Lonely),” which may rely too much on the chorus, but at little over three minutes, it’s hardly a bother. Especially when she’s dropping f-bombs left and right.

Entertainment Weeklys Chris Willman wrote that "it's a pissy yet affectionate rocker that throws down competing desires for attentiveness and space in a relationship." Barry Walters from Rolling Stone wrote that the song "suggests a mood-swinging Strokes mash-up."

Music video
The music video consists of performances from Pink's I'm Not Dead Tour. The video mostly includes shots of performances of "Leave Me Alone (I'm Lonely)", but it also includes clips of performances of songs such as "Stupid Girls", "Fingers", "The One That Got Away" and "U + Ur Hand".

The Funhouse Freakshow Edition

During the Funhouse Summer Carnival Tour, alternate videos were shot for "Funhouse," "Please Don't Leave Me" and "Leave Me Alone (I'm Lonely)." The latter was never filmed, which caused a fuss back during the song's release period among P!nk's fans. P!nk released the video for her fans. Directed by Cole Walliser the video features P!nk and two fat women on the beach. P!nk is playing the guitar alone, suddenly the two women show up. The rest of the video shows P!nk running away from them until finally ditching them.

Track listing
CD single
"Leave Me Alone (I'm Lonely)" – 3:18
"Dear Mr. President" (live from Wembley Arena) – 4:49
"Who Knew" (live from Wembley Arena) – 3:26
"Leave Me Alone (I'm Lonely)" (live from Wembley Arena)
"Live from Wembley Arena – London, England (Trailer)"

Personnel
 Vocals: Pink
 Backing vocals: Pink and Butch Walker
 Mixed by: Tom Lord-Alge
 Assisted by: Femio Hermandez
 Additional programming: Butch Walker
 Drum/Keyboard programming: Dan Chase
 Drums: Mylious Johnson
 Guitars: Butch Walker
 Bass: Butch Walker

Charts

Weekly charts

Year-end charts

Certifications

References

2007 singles
Pink (singer) songs
Songs written by Pink (singer)
Songs written by Butch Walker
Songs about loneliness
2005 songs
LaFace Records singles
Song recordings produced by Butch Walker